Salix laevigata, the red willow or polished willow, is a species of willow native to the southwestern United States  and northern Baja California.

Biology
Like most other willows, it commonly grows along riverbanks and in other areas with high soil moisture. The bark is ridged and grayish, though it sometimes turns reddish with age. Its form is variable, but it will often grow from multiple winding trunks, some more or less straight up, and some growing out far away from the base, even horizontally, and laying along the creek bottom before growing upwards again. Twigs are reddish and flexible when young. Leaves are 3-4 inches long, lanceolate and shiny green on top, dull whitish green underneath. This tree is mostly deciduous during the winter, but can start growing back leaves early during warm snaps in the winter. Yellow flowers grow in drooping catkins. In female red willows, the catkins turn into tufts of cottony seeds, which are windborn, often in large quantities, for 2-3 weeks in the spring. Flowering Time: Dec--Jun

Distribution
The red willow occurs along the coast of Baja California and in California north to Cape Mendocino. It occurs east of the San Joaquin Valley in the lower elevation western foothills of the Sierra Nevada; it is absent from the Central Valley itself. Small occurrences can be found in Oregon, Nevada, and New Mexico. In Arizona it is found in the central transition zone of the Mogollon Rim and in the central Grand Canyon. Its distribution extends to the Virgin River canyon of southwestern Utah.

Ethnobotany
The Kutenai called red willow mukwuʔk, and used it in basketry.

References

External links

Jepson Manual database (Berkeley), California Map
Lady Bird Johnson database

laevigata
Trees of the Southwestern United States
Trees of Baja California
Trees of the South-Central United States